Wilton López (born July 19, 1983) is a Nicaraguan former professional baseball pitcher. He has played in Major League Baseball (MLB) for the Houston Astros and Colorado Rockies.

Professional career
López signed with the New York Yankees in 2002.  He played in their minor league system until he was released in 2007.  He signed with the San Diego Padres two days later.

In 2007, López played for the Fort Wayne Wizards and Lake Elsinore Storm, going 1–0 with a 3.30 ERA in 22 games for the former and 2–1 with a 6.10 ERA in 22 games for the latter. He played for the Storm, San Antonio Missions and Portland Beavers in 2008, going 2–1 with a 2.64 ERA in 30 games with the Storm, 0–2 with a 4.93 ERA in 27 games with the Missions, and 0–0 with a 9.00 ERA in one game with the Beavers.

Houston Astros
On April 10, 2009, López was selected off waivers by the Houston Astros from the Padres. López served as the team's closer in 2012 after Brett Myers was traded to the Chicago White Sox.

Colorado Rockies
López and a player to be named later or cash from the Astros was traded to the Colorado Rockies for pitcher Alex White and minor league pitcher Alex Gillingham. He was designated for assignment on June 9, 2014. He was re-added to the roster on June 21. In October 2014, Lopez elected free agency.

Toronto Blue Jays
López signed a minor league deal with the Toronto Blue Jays on December 12, 2014. He was released on June 30.

In 2019 season, he was selected for Nicaragua national baseball team at the 2019 Pan American Games Qualifier.

References

External links

1983 births
Living people
Baseball players at the 2019 Pan American Games
Battle Creek Yankees players
Colorado Rockies players
Colorado Springs Sky Sox players
Corpus Christi Hooks players
Fort Wayne Wizards players
Gulf Coast Blue Jays players
Gulf Coast Yankees players
Houston Astros players
Lake Elsinore Storm players
Major League Baseball pitchers
Major League Baseball players from Nicaragua
Nicaraguan expatriate baseball players in the United States
Oklahoma City RedHawks players
Pan American Games bronze medalists for Nicaragua
Pan American Games medalists in baseball
Sportspeople from León, Nicaragua
Peoria Saguaros players
Portland Beavers players
Round Rock Express players
San Antonio Missions players
Staten Island Yankees players
Tampa Yankees players
Medalists at the 2019 Pan American Games